Abrazo Scottsdale Campus (formerly Paradise Valley Hospital) is an acute care hospital located in Phoenix, Arizona, in the United States.  Abrazo Scottsdale Campus offers orthopedic services, sports medicines, rehabilitation services, diagnostic imaging, surgical weight loss procedures, women's health services, da Vinci Surgical System, and 24-hour emergency care.

History
Abrazo Scottsdale Campus opened in 1983. It was formerly part of Columbia/HCA, before being spun off as part of Triad Hospitals in 1999. In 2001, Vanguard Health Systems purchased Paradise Valley Hospital from Triad. In 2003, Vanguard established Abrazo Health Care as its Arizona subsidiary. Abrazo is the second largest health care delivery system in Arizona, United States. Abrazo Health Care is located in Phoenix, Arizona. In 2013, Vanguard was acquired by Tenet Healthcare.

Accreditations and recognition
Below are some accreditations given to the hospital by notable organisations.
 Accredited Chest Pain Center by The Society of Chest Pain Centers
 Accredited by the Joint Commission (JCAHO)
Named Top Performers on Key Quality Measures by The Joint Commission
Recognized as ‘Best’ in Arizona (2013, 2014) - Public opinion poll from the Annual Ranking Arizona Magazine's ‘Best of Arizona’. Paradise Valley Hospital - #1 Acute Care Hospital in Arizona

References

External links
 Abrazo Advantage Health Plan
 Abrazo Health Care
 Abrazo Medical Group
 Arrowhead Hospital
 Arizona Heart Institute
 Arizona Heart Hospital
 Maryvale Hospital
 Paradise Valley Hospital
 Phoenix Baptist Hospital
 Phoenix Health Plan
 School-Based Health Centers
 West Valley Hospital

Tenet Healthcare
Hospitals in Arizona
Companies based in Phoenix, Arizona
Trauma centers